Bento Luís Estrela (born February 10, 2006) is a professional footballer who plays as a midfielder for Major League Soccer club New York Red Bulls. Born in the United States, he is a youth international for Portugal.

Club career
Born in Bloomfield, New Jersey, Estrela joined the New York Red Bulls youth academy in July 2019, at the age of 13. He immediately began playing with the club's under-19 squad.

New York Red Bulls
On February 9, 2021, one day before his 15th birthday, Estrela signed a professional homegrown player deal with the New York Red Bulls. At 14 years and 364 days old, Estrela was the 4th youngest signing in Major League Soccer history. Estrela made his professional debut for New York Red Bulls II, the club's reserve side, on August 28, 2022, in their USL Championship match against Birmingham Legion.

International career
In August 2021, Estrela was called into camp with the Portugal U16 side. On May 5, 2022, Estrela made his first appearance for the Portugal under-16's in a 4–1 victory against Belgium. In an interview with the Portuguese Football Federation, Estrela stated that "I feel Portuguese and I represent our colors. I have to do my best for the shield that I carry on my chest."

On August 16, 2022, Estrela was called into camp for the United States under-17 squad.

Career statistics

References

External links
Profile at the New York Red Bulls website

2006 births
Living people
People from Bloomfield, New Jersey
Sportspeople from Essex County, New Jersey
Soccer players from New Jersey
American soccer players
Portuguese footballers
Association football midfielders
New York Red Bulls players
New York Red Bulls II players
USL Championship players
Portugal youth international footballers
United States men's youth international soccer players
Portuguese expatriate footballers
Expatriate soccer players in the United States
Homegrown Players (MLS)